School for Tramps (Spanish: Escuela de vagabundos) is a 1955 Mexican comedy film. It was produced by Fernando de Fuentes. It's considered one of the finest comedies of Mexican cinema, and is adapted from the screenplay for the MGM movie Merrily We Live (1938).

Plot
In a mansion outside a nameless city (apparently Mexico City), lives the wealthy Valverde family: the patriarch Miguel (Oscar Pulido) a businessman; Emilia (Blanca de Castejón), his wife, a fun and good-hearted but slightly deranged woman; and their two daughters: the oldest, Susi, short for Susana, (Miroslava) and Lala, a nickname for Laura (Anabelle Gutiérrez). Emilia often picks up tramps in the hope of reforming them into productive men, but they always disappear after stealing anything they can in the house.

Alberto Medina (Pedro Infante), a famous songwriter, is on a vacation hunting trip in the surrounding woods. The old car he's driving starts heating up and shooting vapor through the radiator; Alberto gets out of the car to search for water. The car then starts going downhill in reverse until it falls off a cliff and gets destroyed, so he has to walk to find help and ends up in Valverde's home, asking to make a phone call; because of his dirty and ragged clothes, Emilia takes him for a tramp and invites him to stay with them. After catching a glimpse of Susi (Miroslava), Alberto accepts, despite the protests of Emilia's family and their butler Audifás. In the following days, he proves to be more than a regular homeless man: helping Miguel when he arrives home drunk, enchanting the heart of Susi, and especially during a business dinner where he secures Miguel's financial investment support from a bank manager but also making Susi jealous after the manager's daughter, Patricia, insists on dating him the next day.

Alberto ends up having a date with Patricia, first at a country club and later at an undisclosed place. During that day, two patrolmen find the destroyed car in the wreckage and find the owner, who confirms that Alberto was driving the vehicle, and they assume he died in the accident. Later that night, Alberto goes back to the Valverde's and, realizing he has no key falls asleep in the back room. The following day when they look for Alberto, they don't find him in the bedroom, then Miguel reads a note in the newspaper where they are informed he died in a car accident, causing a chaotic chain of faints and madness around the house. During the confusion, Alberto finally finds Susi (who fainted first). He kisses her declaring their love after being briefly interrupted by Audifás, who becomes a tramp after seeing all the luck they have.

Cast
 Pedro Infante – Alberto Medina
 Miroslava – Suzi Valverde
 Oscar Pulido –  Miguel Valverde
 Blanca de Castejón – Emilia de Valverde
 Anabelle Gutiérrez – Lala Valverde
 Oscar Ortiz de Pinedo – Humberto Vértiz
 Eduardo Alcaraz – Audifás, the Butler
 Fernando Casanova – Mauricio
 Liliana Durán – Patricia Vértiz
 Ramón Valdés – Taxista
 Dolores Camarillo – Pancha, a Servant

Reception and legacy
The film met with positive reviews from contemporary critics upon release and proved a commercial success.

During the 1955 Ariel Awards, the film won two Silver Ariels, one for Best Supporting Actress (Blanca de Castejón) and one for Best Young Actress (Anabelle Gutiérrez).

It is considered one of the most beloved comedy films of all time and is often broadcast on television. It has the distinction to be the last film premiered during Miroslava's lifetime; she committed suicide five weeks after the film opened.

Music
Pedro Infante sang five songs in this movie:

External links
 

1955 films
1950s Spanish-language films
Films directed by Rogelio A. González
Mexican comedy-drama films
1955 comedy-drama films
Mexican black-and-white films
1950s Mexican films